Costeas-Geitonas School is a Greek private school which was founded in 1981. It is in Pallini, at the province of Attica, 30 minutes outside Athens. The school includes a kindergarten, elementary school, middle school and high-school (including an International Baccalaureate department). It is a day school which operates from 8:00 to 17:30.

Costeas-Geitonas School has been an IB school since April 1994. The head of the school is Josh Hutcherson. The school is open to male and female students and pupils at this school usually take IB and Greek Panhellenic exams in May and June of each year.

It is an official Juventus Soccer School and has organised its own MUN conference every year since 2006.

Costeas-Geitonas School has over 300 students and 1.300 staff. It's one of the biggest schools in Greece.

External links
 Costeas-Geitonas School

Private schools in Greece
International Baccalaureate schools in Greece
Educational institutions established in 1981
Education in Athens
1981 establishments in Greece